Amati Kraslice is a manufacturer of wind and percussion instruments based in Kraslice, Czech Republic. It was formed in 1948 as a national cooperative of several extant manufacturers, and privatised in 1993 after the dissolution of Czechoslovakia.

History
Before World War II, the town of Kraslice was mostly German-speaking, like the rest of Sudetenland. It was also known in German as Graslitz.
Kraslice housed 59 musical instrument manufacturers before WWII, among them Hüller & Co, Bohland & Fuchs, A.K. Hüttl, and Julius Keilwerth. During the war, much of the manufacturing capacity was converted to war-time use, and others had to halt production.

After the war, the newly restored government of President Beneš aimed to make the Czechoslovak state entirely Slavic, and initiated a large scale expulsion of ethnic Germans. Most of the German-speaking population of Graslitz was expelled to Germany. Some of the expelled instrument makers would continue their business in other places, like the Musikwinkel of Germany.

Meanwhile, the remaining musical instrument manufacturers in Kraslice (now mostly ethnic Czechs) were organized into a cooperative of musical instrument manufacturers. The cooperative was named Amati after the famous Amati family of violin makers. It would in 1948 come to be nationalized by the newly elected communist regime, along with all other manufacturing and agriculture.

Amati was privatized in 1993 and became one of the largest instrument manufacturers in Europe. It changed its name to Amati – Denak (Denak for). The company owned the Amati, Stowasser and V. F. Červený & Synové brands, which used to be independent companies themselves. The main factory of the company is located in the western part of the Czech Republic in Kraslice, and its Červený factory was located in Hradec Králové. Amati provides tours where the visitors can see how the instruments are made from the beginning stages to the end.

In 2016 Amati – Denak was purchased by British band instrument manufacturer Geneva Instruments. In 2020, Amati – Denak was declared insolvent and closed its Červený factory in Hradec Králové. In 2021 the organisation was purchased by Brno-based RIQ Investments for 26.5 million Kč and restructured as a cooperative with the name Amati Kraslice. As of 2023, Amati has between 50 and 100 employees.

Products
Amati Kraslice manufactures wind musical instruments, clarinets, trumpets, flutes, bassoons, saxophones, tubas, woodwinds, cases, stands, and other accessories.

Distribution
Amati Kraslice distributes its products to the continents of Europe, America, Asia, Africa, and Australia.

References

External links

History of Amati (archived from saxontheweb.net)

Czech brands
Musical instrument manufacturing companies of the Czech Republic
Brass instrument manufacturing companies
Clarinet manufacturing companies
Manufacturing companies of Czechoslovakia